The Secret Life: Jeffrey Dahmer is a 1993 American low budget biographical crime drama film directed by David R. Bowen. It stars Carl Crew as Jeffrey Dahmer, an American serial killer, necrophile, and cannibal.

The film is a firsthand account of Dahmer's lifestyle as a serial killer. When he was finally caught, it was revealed that his apartment was a chamber of horrors, where, according to the film, he tortured his young victims to death. Then he sliced up the bodies and stored the parts in his freezer, among other places. The Secret Life: Jeffrey Dahmer was produced one year before Dahmer was himself murdered in prison.

See also
 Dahmer – A 2002 biographical true crime horror film (starring Jeremy Renner as Dahmer).
 My Friend Dahmer – A 2017 biographical drama film (starring Ross Lynch as Dahmer).
 The Jeffrey Dahmer Files – A 2012 independent documentary film.
 Dahmer – Monster: The Jeffrey Dahmer Story – A 10-part biographical crime drama series that was commissioned by Netflix and released on September 21, 2022 (starring Evan Peters as Dahmer).

References

External links

1993 films
Films set in Wisconsin
Films about Jeffrey Dahmer
American serial killer films
Biographical films about serial killers
Necrophilia in film
1990s English-language films
1990s American films